Sheep Mesa is located in the Absaroka Range in the U.S. state of Wyoming. Sheep Mesa is at the south end of Blackwater Canyon and is at the head of the drainage for Blackwater Creek.

References

Mountains of Wyoming
Mountains of Park County, Wyoming
Shoshone National Forest